A pillow block bearing (or plummer block) is a pedestal used to provide support for a rotating shaft with the help of compatible bearings and various accessories. The assembly consists of a mounting block which houses a bearing. The block is mounted to a foundation and a shaft is inserted allowing the inner part of the bearing / shaft to rotate. The inside of the bearing is typically  larger than the shaft to ensure a tight fit. Set screws, locking collars, or set collars are commonly used to secure the shaft. Housing material for a pillow block is typically made of cast iron or cast steel.

Selection
A pillow block usually refers to a housing with an included anti-friction bearing, wherein the mounted shaft is in a parallel plane to the mounting surface, and perpendicular to the center line of the mounting holes, as contrasted with various types of flange blocks or flange units. A pillow block may contain a bearing with one of several types of rolling elements, including ball, cylindrical roller, spherical roller, tapered roller, or metallic or synthetic bushing. The type of rolling element defines the type of pillow block. These differ from "plummer blocks" which are bearing housings supplied without any bearings and are usually meant for higher load ratings and a separately installed bearing. Plummer block bearings are designed for more corrosive environments.

The fundamental application of both types is the same, which is to mount a bearing safely enabling its outer ring to be stationary while allowing rotation of the inner ring. The housing is bolted to a foundation through the holes in the base. Bearing housings may be either split type or solid type. Split type housings are usually two-piece housings where the cap and base may be detached, while solid are single-piece housings. Various sealing arrangements may be provided to prevent dust and other contaminants from entering the housing. Thus the housing provides a clean environment for the environmentally sensitive bearing to rotate free from contaminants while also retaining lubrication, either oil or grease, hence increasing its performance and duty cycle. 

Bearing housings are usually made of grey cast iron. However, various grades of metals can be used to manufacture the same, including ductile iron, steel, stainless steel, and various types of thermoplastics and polyethylene-based plastics. The bearing element may be manufactured from 52100 chromium steel alloy (the most common), stainless steel, plastic, or bushing materials such as SAE660 cast bronze, or SAE841 oil impregnated sintered bronze, or synthetic materials.

ISO 113 specifies internationally accepted dimensions for plummer blocks.

See also 
 Bearing surface
 Plain bearing

References

Bearings (mechanical)